The 2022–23 season is the 134th season in the existence of Forest Green Rovers Football Club and the club's first ever season in League One following their promotion from League Two in the previous season. In addition to the league, they will also compete in the 2022–23 FA Cup, the 2022–23 EFL Cup and the 2022–23 EFL Trophy.

Transfers

In

Out

Loans in

Loans out

Pre-season and friendlies
On June 14, FGR announced three pre-season friendlies against Melksham Town, Swindon Supermarine and Newport County.

Competitions

Overall record

League One

League table

Results summary

Results by round

Matches

On 23 June, the league fixtures were announced.

FA Cup

FGR were drawn at home to Birmingham City in the third round.

EFL Cup

FGR were drawn at home to Leyton Orient in the first round and to Brighton & Hove Albion in the second round.

EFL Trophy

On 20 June, the initial Group stage draw was made, grouping Forest Green Rovers with Exeter City and Newport County.

References

Forest Green Rovers
Forest Green Rovers F.C. seasons